Stephen Potts (born 1957) is a British author of children’s books, particularly historical adventure novels set at sea.

Potts was born in Norwich, England, to an English father then serving in the Royal Navy, and an Irish mother. He started school in northern Scotland, and continued in various parts of England, before entering Corpus Christi College, Cambridge, to study medical sciences. He subsequently transferred to Magdalen College, Oxford, to study clinical medicine, and while there rowed for Oxford University (Isis) in the 1981 Boat Race.

He continued medical studies in the United States, before returning to London and then Edinburgh to specialise in psychiatry. He works part-time as a Consultant in Liaison Psychiatry in Edinburgh Royal Infirmary, mainly in the emergency department and kidney, liver and pancreas transplant services.

He took up writing for children in the 1990s, beginning with a loosely connected trilogy collectively known as The Running Tide. The three books cover the period from the mid 19th century to the present day, and are variously set in Britain, Greenland and the Aleutian islands. Described as “good, old-fashioned tales of courage and adventure” (Observer, 2001) they pit child protagonists against the dangers of the ocean and the polar ice, as well as malevolent adults.

His most recent book, Abigail’s Gift, tells intertwined stories of a Highland lass at the time of the Clearances, and a modern schoolgirl troubled by bullying and an overactive imagination.

In March 2007 he was commissioned by Dynamic Entertainment DEH, a Dutch independent film production company, to adapt Philip Pullman’s 1992 novel The Butterfly Tattoo (previously published as The White Mercedes) as a feature film, released theatrically and on DVD in 2009.

Bibliography 

Children’s Prose

Novels

1999	Hunting Gumnor
   	 	
Nominated for the Carnegie Medal 2000

Runner-up for the Branford Boase award 2000

Republished in 2004

2001	Compass Murphy 
 	
Shortlisted, Askews Children's Book Award 2002

Japanese translation published  by Kyuryu-do 2005

Republished in 2004

2004	The Ship Thief	

2006	Abigail's Gift

Shorter illustrated books for younger readers 

2000	Tommy Trouble 	 	
Nominated for the Carnegie Medal 2001

2008    Into the Storm

2009    Operation Hope

Short Stories

1999	On the Bench	(in Family Tree, ed. M Hodgson )
2002	Abigail's Gift	(in Love From Dad. ed M. Hodgson)

Radio

	Grandmother’s Footsteps (Island Blue) broadcast on BBC Radio 4 in June 2006.

Medical 
Potts has written or co-written scientific papers, books, book chapters, and editorials in the fields of non-cardiac chest pain, psychiatry, and euthanasia. He has contributed to the Edinburgh textbooks of psychiatry and medicine:

Legal and Ethical Aspects of Psychiatry (with JHM Crichton and RS Smyth) in Companion to Psychiatric Studies, 8th edition, eds Eve C Johnstone et al., Churchill Livingston Edinburgh 2010

Medical Psychiatry (with  MC Sharpe) in Davidson’s Principles & Practice  of Medicine, 20th edition,  ed NA Boon et al., Churchill Livingstone, Edinburgh 2006

External links
Publishers: EgmontBarrington Stoke

IMDb page: 

Film: The Butterfly Tattoo

Website: 

"See also": 

Writers from Norwich
Alumni of Magdalen College, Oxford
British writers
British psychiatrists
Living people
Year of birth missing (living people)